The 2018 season of competitive association football in Indonesia.

Promotion and relegation

National teams

Men's national football team

Friendlies

International Friendlies

2018 AFF Championship

Group B

Men's under-23 football team

Friendlies

International Friendlies

Non-International Friendlies

2018 PSSI Anniversary Cup

2018 Asian Games

Group A

Knockout stage

Men's under-19 football team

Friendlies

International Friendlies

Non-International Friendlies

2018 AFF U-19 Youth Championship

Group A

Knockout stage

2018 AFC U-19 Championship

Group A

Knockout stage

Men's under-16 football team

Friendlies

International Friendlies

Non-International Friendlies

2018 JENESYS Tournament

Group B

Knockout phase

2018 AFF U-16 Youth Championship

Group A

Knockout stage

2018 AFC U-16 Championship

Group C

Knockout stage

Women's football team

Friendlies

International Friendlies

2018 AFF Women's Championship

Group B

2018 Asian Games

Group A

Women's under-16 football team

2018 AFF U-16 Girls' Championship

Group B

League season

Liga 1

Liga 2 

First Round

Second Round

Knockout Round

Final

Liga 3 

First Round

Second Round

Third Round

Final

Domestic Cups

Piala Indonesia

AFC Competitions

AFC Champions League

Qualifying play-offs

Preliminary round 1

Preliminary round 2

AFC Cup

Group stage

Group G

Group H

Knockout stage

Zonal semi-finals

References